Hoiby or Høiby is a surname. Notable people with the surname include: 

Jasper Høiby (born 1977), Danish jazz musician 
Lee Hoiby (1926-2011), American composer and pianist
Sven O. Høiby (1936-2007), father of Crown Princess Mette-Marit of Norway
Trond Høiby (born 1973), Norwegian decathlete